Derrick H.M. Chan (born December 1, 1955) is a Judge of the Hawaii Intermediate Court of Appeals.

Education

Chan received his Bachelor of Arts from the University of Hawaii and his Juris Doctor from California Western School of Law.

Legal career

Chan served as First Deputy Prosecutor for the County of Kauaʻi. He also served as an attorney for the Hawaii Carpenters Union, as Deputy Public Defender for the state, law clerk to Judge Wilfred Watanabe, and Deputy Attorney General for the state.

State court service

He appointed as a Circuit Court Judge on Aug. 25, 2000.

Service on the Hawaii Intermediate Court of Appeals

On February 3, 2017 Governor David Ige nominated Chan to be a Judge of the Intermediate Court of Appeals to the seat vacated by the retirement of Daniel R. Foley. His nomination was confirmed by the state senate on March 3, 2017. He was sworn in on April 13, 2017. Chan was among those considered to become Chief Judge of the Hawaii Intermediate Court of Appeals.

Hawaii Supreme Court vacancy

In November 2011 Chan was considered to fill a vacancy on the Hawaii Supreme Court.

See also
List of Asian American jurists

References

External links

Official Biography on Court of Appeals website

Living people
1955 births
20th-century American lawyers
21st-century American judges
American jurists of Asian descent
California Western School of Law alumni
Hawaii lawyers
Hawaii state court judges
Public defenders
University of Hawaiʻi alumni